William Wooden Wood House is a historic home located at Huntington in Suffolk County, New York. It was built in 1868 and is a -story, three-bay clapboard residence with a -story, four-bay clapboard west wing. The roof features a major gambrel cross-gable with round arched window, wooden ccrsting and finials at the ridge line and two interior end chimneys.

It was added to the National Register of Historic Places in 1985.

References

Houses on the National Register of Historic Places in New York (state)
Houses completed in 1868
Houses in Suffolk County, New York
National Register of Historic Places in Huntington (town), New York